Special Jollof is a 2020 Nigerian-American romantic comedy film. Produced and directed by Emem Isong; Starring Joseph Benjamin, Uche Jombo and Femi Adebayo in the lead roles. The film was majorly shot in Nigeria and United States. The theme of the film is set as a love story, with immigration in the background. The film was released on 14 February 2020 coinciding with Valentine's Day and also with the celebration of the Black History Month in the United States.

Cast 

 Joseph Benjamin
 Uche Jombo
 Femi Adebayo
  DJ Kelblizz 
 John Maciag
 Magdalen Vaughn
 Bukky Wright
 Robert Peters
 Chiwetalu Agu
 Perez Egbi

Synopsis 
A white American woman journalist who revives after a breakup with her lover starts working as an undercover at a Nigerian restaurant to prove that Nigerians migrate illegally to the USA. She then eventually falls in love with a Nigerian guy.

References

External links 
 

2020 films
2020 romantic comedy-drama films
Nigerian romantic comedy-drama films
American romantic comedy-drama films
2020s English-language films
English-language Nigerian films
Films shot in Nigeria
Films shot in the United States
2020s American films